Armand dela Cruz Arreza (born November 20, 1971) was the 4th Administrator & Chief Executive Officer of the Subic Bay Metropolitan Authority (SBMA). As of present, he was the youngest official to hold the title of Administrator.

Biography and career

Armand Arreza was born on November 20, 1971, in Quezon City, Philippines, the eldest of the three children of Andres C. Arreza of Cantilan, Surigao del Sur and Priscilla C. Arreza of Manila. His siblings are Arnel C. Arreza and Pamela C. Arreza.

Education

He attended La Salle Green Hills (LSGH) for both his Elementary and Secondary Education, and graduated in 1985 and 1989 respectively.  He earned his Bachelor of Science in Management Engineering at the Ateneo de Manila University in 1993. He received his Masters of Business Administration Majoring in Finance and Operations at the Wharton School of the University of Pennsylvania in Philadelphia, Pennsylvania, in 1998.

During his study in the Wharton School, he became a trustee of the Wharton-Penn Club Foundation. He also later became the chairman for the Youth Committee of the Rotary Club of Makati, Dasmarinas.

Private sector

Prior to becoming the SBMA Administrator, He was a senior consultant for the Hong Kong branch of the Monitor Company, a multinational strategy consultancy firm.

From 2000 to 2002, he was the Chief Operating Officer of Globalstride Customer Services. After this, he became the Operations Director of the American International Group (AIG) Business Processing services, Inc. from January 2005 - September 2005.

In 2006, he became a member of the Board of Governors of the Philippine National Red Cross.

Political career
His initiation into the ranks of the Subic Bay Metropolitan Authority began way back in 1993. Fresh from college, he was among the first employees of SBMA, being a Financial Analyst for the corporation's privatization of infrastructure assets.

Department of Tourism
After his experience working with various multinational companies he returned to the political scene when he was selected in 2003 as the Undersecretary of the Department of Tourism (DOT). With his assistance, the department headed WOW Philippines Intramuros, a multi-agency initiative for revitalizing Manila's historic district.

Subic Bay Metropolitan Authority
In September 2005, following the turnover of SBMA's management, he was appointed as the Administrator and chief executive officer of the Government-Owned & Controlled Corporation. He stepped down on September 19, 2011.

References

External links
Subic Bay Information Portal
Subic Bay Area Tourism and Visitor Information
Greater Subic Bay  Tourism Bureau 
Subic Bay Area Tour Information
Official Web Site of Subic Bay Freeport Zone
Expat Concierge Services-Subic Bay, Olongapo, Zambales
Subic Bay News

1971 births
Living people
Wharton School of the University of Pennsylvania alumni
People from Quezon City
Chairmen of the Subic Bay Metropolitan Authority
Arroyo administration personnel
Ateneo de Manila University alumni